The Institute for International Economic Studies (IIES) is a Swedish research institute at Stockholm University, founded in the early 1960s. The main objective is to produce outstanding research for publication in leading international journals. The faculty at IIES consists of 18 full time researchers and publishes on around 4 papers in the top five economics journals each year.

Scholars from the IIES have received a number of international awards, such as the Nobel Memorial Prize in Economic Sciences and the Yrjö Jahnsson Award. Among many other honors, two IIES scholars have been elected Presidents of the European Economic Association, one elected President of the Econometric Society, three elected Foreign Honorary Members of the American Academy of Arts and Sciences, and six elected members of the Royal Swedish Academy of Sciences. A number of IIES scholars hold positions on the Editorial boards of top international journals.

Current academic staff at IIES

Professors 

Ingvild Almås
Lars Calmfors
Harry Flam 
John Hassler 	
Per Krusell
Assar Lindbeck 	
Mats Persson 	
Torsten Persson
David Strömberg		
Jakob Svensson  (director)
Peter Svedberg

Assistant and associate professors 

Almut Balleer
Tessa Bold
Timo Boppart
Tobias Broer
Konrad Buchardi
Jonathan de Quidt
Mitch Downey
Alexandre Kohlhas
Kurt Mitman
Arash Nekoei
Peter Nilsson
Kathrin Schlafmann
Yimei Zou

References

External links
 Institute for International Economic Studies

Economic research institutes
Research institutes in Sweden
Stockholm University